Alburnoides gmelini, the Dagestan spirlin, is a fish species of the family Cyprinidae, known from the western Caspian coast of southern Russia. I can be differentiated from its cogenerates by differences in fin ray and vertebral counts, together with other morphological characters. The specific bane honors Samuel Gottlieb Gmelin, a Russian-German naturalist who traveled through the River Don area and the Caucasus region and along the western and southern Caspian Sea coasts between 1768 and 1774.

References

Further reading
Turan, Davut, et al. "Alburnoides manyasensis (Actinopterygii, Cyprinidae), a new species of cyprinid fish from Manyas Lake basin, Turkey." ZooKeys 276 (2013): 85.
Naseka, A. M. "Zoogeographical freshwater divisions of the Caucasus as a part of the West Asian Transitional Region." Proceedings of the Zoological Institute, Russian Academy of Sciences 314.4 (2010): 469–492.

Alburnoides
Fish described in 2009
Fish of Russia